Razan Rural District is a rural district (dehestan) in Zagheh District, Khorramabad County, Lorestan Province, Iran. At the 2006 census, its population was 3,102, in 694 families.  The rural district has 11 villages.

References 

Rural Districts of Lorestan Province
Khorramabad County